Deimantas Petravičius (born 2 September 1995) is a Lithuanian footballer, who plays as a winger and is currently playing for Águilas FC, having previously played for Nottingham Forest, Stevenage (on loan), Zaglebie Lubin, Motherwell, Falkirk, Okzhetpes and Queen of the South.

Club career
After graduating from the National Football Academy of Lithuania, Petravicius signed for Nottingham Forest, then after a loan spell at Stevenage he signed for Zaglebie Lubin.

On 22 August 2017, Petravičius signed for Motherwell on a contract until the end of the 2017–18 season. debuting on 28 October 2017 as a substitute in a 1–0 home defeat versus Hibernian. Petravičius was released by Well in the 2018 close season.

Petravičius then signed a two-year contract with Falkirk before the start of the 2018-19 season.

On 27 June 2019, Petravičius signed for Kazakhstan Premier League club FC Okzhetpes on a contract until the end of the 2019 season.
On 30 January 2020, Petravicius returned to Scotland to sign for Dumfries club Queen of the South until the end of the 2019-20 season.

International career
Petravičius made five appearances for Lithuania U19, including three games in the 2013 UEFA European Under-19 Championship.

Petravicius graduated to Lithuania U21, playing three matches with one arriving in the 2013 UEFA European Under-21 Championship, a 3–0 defeat versus Moldova U21.

Petravičius made his debut for the Lithuania national senior team on 18 November 2013 in a friendly versus Moldova and his second appearance was as a substitute during Lithuania's 1–1 friendly draw with Kazakhstan.

International goals
Scores and results list Lithuania's goal tally first.

References

External links
 
 

1995 births
Living people
Lithuanian footballers
Association football midfielders
Nottingham Forest F.C. players
Lithuania international footballers
Lithuania under-21 international footballers
Stevenage F.C. players
English Football League players
Expatriate footballers in England
Lithuanian expatriate footballers
Lithuanian expatriate sportspeople in England
Ekstraklasa players
Zagłębie Lubin players
Expatriate footballers in Poland
Lithuanian expatriate sportspeople in Poland
Motherwell F.C. players
Scottish Professional Football League players
Expatriate footballers in Scotland
Lithuanian expatriate sportspeople in Scotland
Falkirk F.C. players
Águilas FC players